Olympique Lillois was a French association football club from the city of Lille. Founded in 1902 they merged with SC Fives in 1944 to form Lille OSC.

Honours
Championnat de France
Champion: 1914, 1933
Runner-up: 1936
Trophée de France
Winner: 1914.
Championnat USFSA
Champion: 1914.
Championnat USFSA Nord:
Champion: 1911, 1913, 1914.
Championnat DH Nord:
Champion: 1921, 1922, 1929, 1931
Coupe Peugeot:
Finalist: 1931.

Coaches
1931–32: Imre Nagy
1932–34: Robert De Veen
1934–35: Bob Fisher
1935–37: Ted Magner
1937–38: Steirling
1938–39: Jenő Konrád
1941–43: Georges Winckelmans
1943–44: Denglos

Bibliography

References

Defunct football clubs in France
Lille OSC
Association football clubs established in 1902
Association football clubs disestablished in 1944
1902 establishments in France
1944 disestablishments in France
Football clubs in Hauts-de-France
Ligue 1 clubs